Rebel Army may refer to:

 Cork City F.C., an Irish association football team
 Supporters of the Melbourne Rebels, an Australian rugby union team